The 1931 Notre Dame Fighting Irish football team represented the University of Notre Dame during the 1931 college football season, led by first-year head coach Hunk Anderson.

Following the death of head coach Knute Rockne in a plane crash on  line coach Anderson was promoted on 

Notre Dame entered the season on a 19-game winning streak and opened with a road win, but then had a scoreless tie with Northwestern in the second game, played at Soldier Field in Chicago. Five straight wins followed and the unbeaten string extended to 26 games, until visiting USC won by  the Trojans were the last team to defeat Notre Dame, three years earlier  The next week, Army shut out the Irish  at Yankee Stadium to conclude the season.

Schedule

References

Notre Dame
Notre Dame Fighting Irish football seasons
Notre Dame Fighting Irish football